"I'd Rather Love You" is a song written by Johnny Duncan, and recorded by American country music artist Charley Pride.  It was released in January 1971 as the first single from the album I'm Just Me.  The song was Pride's sixth song to top the U.S. country singles chart. The single stayed at number one for three weeks, spending a total of 13 weeks on the chart.

Chart performance

References

1971 singles
1971 songs
Charley Pride songs
Songs written by Johnny Duncan (country singer)
Song recordings produced by Jack Clement
RCA Records singles